The Lookout Mountain Fairyland Club on Lookout Mountain in Georgia, is listed on the National Register of Historic Places.  It was designed by Chattanooga architect William Hatfield Sears.  Grounds were enhanced by landscape architect Warren Henry Manning.

The listing included 11 contributing buildings:  a main clubhouse and ten cottages.  The clubhouse has a tower and crenelations and 65 rooms.  The cottages were each two-story and had six or more rooms.

Its grounds had the world's second miniature golf course.  This is associated with Rock City attraction, also listed on the National Register.

References

Clubhouses on the National Register of Historic Places in Georgia (U.S. state)
Tudor Revival architecture in the United States
Buildings and structures completed in 1928
National Register of Historic Places in Walker County, Georgia